"The Fiddler of Dooney" is a poem by William Butler Yeats first published in 1892.

In popular culture
Dooney Rock is a small hill overlooking Lough Gill in County Sligo. The rock is located just outside Sligo itself. The prestigious instrumental competition held in Sligo and known at the Fiddler of Dooney Competition is also named after the poem.

Winners of the Fiddler of Dooney Competition 2016

Junior Winners 
 1st place: Ademar O'Connor
 2nd place: Ellen O'Gorman
 3rd place: Seamus O'Gorman

Senior Winners 
 1st place: Jason McGuinness
 2nd place: Caoimhe Kearins
 3rd place: Clare Anne Kearns

See also
List of works by William Butler Yeats

Popular culture
In his LP Branduardi canta Yeats (1986), Angelo Branduardi sings an italian version of this poem.

References

1899 poems
Poetry by W. B. Yeats